Sherbet is a fizzy, sweet powder, usually eaten by dipping a lollipop or liquorice, using a small spoon, or licking it from a finger.

Etymology
The word "sherbet" is from Turkish , which is from Persian , which in turn comes from "sharbat", Arabic  sharbah, a drink, from "shariba" to drink. The word is cognate to syrup in English. Historically it was a cool effervescent or iced fruit soft drink. The meaning, spelling and pronunciation have fractured between different countries. It is usually spelled "sherbet", but a common south of England pronunciation, using the intrusive 'r' changes this to "sherbert".

History

Beginning with the 19th century sherbet powder (soda powder) became popular. "Put a spoonful of the powder in a cup of water, mix it and drink it as soon as possible, during the time of sparkling. ... Because this way the most of acid of air is lost ... it is more practicable to put the powder into the mouth and flush it with some water." 2 g of sodium bicarbonate and 1.5 g of tartaric acid were separately packed in little coloured paper bags.

Sherbet used to be stirred into various beverages to make effervescing drinks, in a similar way to making lemonade from lemonade powders, before canned carbonated drinks became ubiquitous. Sherbet is now used to mean this powder sold as a sweet. (In the United States, it would be somewhat comparable to the powder in Pixy Stix or Fun Dip, though having the fizzy quality of effervescing candy, such as Pop Rocks.)

Ingredients
Sherbet in the United Kingdom and other Commonwealth countries is a fizzy powder, containing sugar and flavouring, and an edible acid and base. The acid may be tartaric, citric or malic acid, and the base may be sodium bicarbonate, sodium carbonate, magnesium carbonate, or a mixture of these and/or other similar carbonates. To mask the unappetising flavour of the reactive powders, a large amount of sugar is added, as well as icing sugar and fruit or cream soda flavouring. The acid-carbonate reaction occurs upon presence of moisture (juice/saliva), becoming "fizzy".

Products

Sherbet can be sold by itself or used as a decorative agent on other sweets. The measured qualities of sherbet include granularity, colour, "zing" (acidity) and flavouring (normally a citrus fruit).

Sherbet lemon and Zotz

Sherbet lemons are a popular sweet in the UK, and are sold in most sweet shops. They are boiled sweets which have an intense lemon flavour with powdered sherbet centres. Variants, such as sherbet fruits including sherbet limes, strawberries, blackcurrants, raspberries and orange are all popular flavours. The sherbet lemon has a strong citrus taste and is sour and tangy. The sherbet in the middle releases, giving a sensation of extreme lemon bittersweet with fizzy light tangy crisp sour.

In the Harry Potter series, the character Albus Dumbledore has a particular fondness for sherbet lemons; their name is the passphrase for access to his office.

A similar candy, made in Italy and popular in the United States, is Zotz, a brand sold in various fruit flavours.

Sherbet Fountain

Barratt's "Sherbet Fountain" consists of a 25g tube of sherbet with a liquorice stick, and has been sold since 1925. An alternative version consists of a strawberry flavour hard gelatine candy stick, which is red in color. The original concept of the sherbert fountain was sold to Barratt's by Henry Edward Brunt, and was rebranded under their name.

In the traditional paper packaging, the top of the stick was intended to be bitten off to form a straw and the sherbet sucked through it, where it fizzes and dissolves on the tongue. The "new" format only includes a solid liquorice stick, so the sherbet must be licked off that, or eaten directly. This method of consumption was also considered acceptable with the original packaging, which has since been replaced with a solid plastic tube to improve the product's freshness and shelf life. This is advertised on the packet as "sherbet with a liquorice dip".

With fruit flavoured lollipop
Sherbet dips or sherbet dabs are also popular, such as the Dip Dab by Barratt. They consist of a 23g packet of "lemon flavour sherbet dip with a strawberry flavour lolly" sealed into the bag. The sherbet is sucked clean from the lollipop, it can be repeatedly dipped into the sherbet then sucked clean, or used to spoon the sherbet direct into the mouth.

Flying saucers

Flying saucers are small dimpled discs of edible coloured paper (rice paper), typically filled with white unflavoured sherbet (the same form as in Sherbet Fountains).  The first flying saucers were produced in the 1950s in Belgium.

Slang
Sherbet has been used in parts of both the UK and Australia as slang for an alcoholic drink, especially beer.  This use is noted in a slang dictionary as early as 1890, and still appears in lists of slang terms written today (especially lists of Australian slang). "We're heading to the pub for a few sherbets" – meaning "... pints of beer."

See also
 Sharbat (Middle Eastern drink)
 Italian ice
 Sorbet
 Pixy Stix – a popular brand of dextrose-rich sherbet powder manufactured by Ferrera
 Fun Dip – another powder made by Ferrera, in a different format
 Swizzels Matlow – a notable manufacturer of sherbet products
 Pop Rocks – a similar confection that pops and fizzes in contact with saliva
 Zotz (candy) – a candy with a hard exterior and an interior filled with fizzy powder

References

External links

 Of the Street Sale of Ginger-Beer, Sherbet, Lemonade,&C., from London Labour and the London Poor, Volume 1, Henry Mayhew, 1851; subsequent pages cover the costs and income of street sherbet sellers.
 Tangerine Confectionery homepage
 Instructions to make sherbet

Candy
British confectionery
Powders